Birendra Agrahari (also spells as Virendra) is a Nepalese playback singer who primarily sings in Nepali, Oriya, Hindi and Bhojpuri languages.
He lent his voice for a debut Nepali film Undone By Love starring Dilip Rayamajhi and Jharana Bajracharya in 2004 which was released in Hong Kong and Nepal.

Early life 
Agrahari is a native of Butwal, Nepal.

Career 
Birendra made his film debut with a song for the movie Pareni Maya Jalaima (Undone By Love) in 2004. He sings for several Nepali films, albums and has performed in many stage shows and events. Birendra sang in the music album Rumal Chhod Jau.

Discography 
Below is an incomplete discography:

 Hiun Bhanda by Suman Chetri & Birendra Agrahari
 Chal Bolbam
 Aail Sawan Ka Mahina, from the album Chali Jalwa Chadhaye
 Juni Juni Sath, from the album Rumal Chhodi Jau
 Madhur Muskan 
 Chehre Pani

References

External links

21st-century Nepalese male singers
Living people
Nepalese playback singers
People from Butwal
Year of birth missing (living people)